Birjand (also Romanized as Bīrjand and Birdjand) is a city in the Central District of Birjand County, South Khorasan province, Iran, and serves as capital of the county. The city is known for its saffron, barberry, jujube, and handmade carpet exports.

At the 2006 census, the population of the city was 157,848 in 41,341 households. The following census in 2011 counted 178,020 people in 48,130 households. The latest census in 2016 showed a population of 203,636 people in 57,745 households.

History

The first citation of the city in the historical literature belongs to the famous book Mojem Alboldan, by Yaqut Homavi (13th century) which introduces the Birjand as the most beautiful town in the Qohestan. Before this, Birjand had been probably not as big and important as a municipality but rather as a rural community. However, the Birjand geographical area had its historical and political importance long before the emergence of the city of Birjand. Many citations of the region are available in the original literature like Ehya -ol- Molook of the once important localities in the area. Numerous fine drawings and inscriptions are carved on an igneous rock surface. The inscriptions include pictograms as well as Arsacid Pahlavi, Sasanian Pahlavi, Arabic and Persian scripts.

Climate

Birjand has a cold semi-arid climate (Köppen climate classification BSk) with hot summers and cool winters and a significant difference between day and night temperatures.  Precipitation falls mostly in winter and spring.

Official services

Municipality 
In 1931, Birjand Municipality was opened under the name of Birjand Municipality next to the tomb of Hakim Nazari and started its activities with 12 employees. The first mayor of Birjand was Mr. Afshar, who served as mayor for six years.

University 
In 1975, following Dr. Mohammad Hassan Ganji, the Birjand Institute of Higher Education was established in the Assadollah Alam Endowment Collection. This university started with the admission of 120 students in the fields of mathematics, physics and chemistry and is now officially known as Birjand University.

Airport 
In 1933, due to the political and military situation of Birjand city and the east of the country, Birjand airport was established on a 150-hectare land in the north of the city.

Customs 
In 1938, in order to facilitate the transportation, export and import of goods to the subcontinent of India and Afghanistan, the Birjand Customs Office was established and started its activities with two customs units, Dareh and Gezik.

Imam Reza Hospital 
In 1948, Imam Reza Hospital was established in one of the lands and endowments belonging to the Alam family, known as Bagh-e Anari. In addition to accepting patients in Birjand city, this hospital also accepted other patients in southern cities of Khorasan province.

Education
It is said that the Shokatiyeh School in Birjand together with Darolfonoon in Tehran were the first modern public schools of higher education in Iran in the mid-19th century. Ever since then, Birjand has amassed an abundance of institutions of higher education and become an important location for research and development.

The city contains such universities and academic institutions as:

University of Birjand
Birjand University of Technology
Birjand University of Medical Sciences
Payame Noor University
Islamic Azad University of Birjand
University of Applied Science and Technology (south khorasan branch)
Academy of Tarbiat-e Moalem
Academy of Amuzesh-e Aly
Academy of Amuzesh-e Modiriat Dolaty

Notable people
Abd al-Ali al-Birjandi, 16th century astronomer
Hakim Nezari Quhestani
Ibn Hessam Khusfi
Amir Shokat Ul-Molk Alam, Amir of Qaen County and Governor of Quhestan at the end of Qajar Dynasty
Amir Ali Khan Sheibany, PhD, founder and first CEO of Zob Ahan Esfahan (Esfahan Steel Company)
Seyyed Mohammad Tadayyon
Asadollah Alam, prime minister of Iran during Pahlavi dynasty
Seyyed Gholam Reza Saeidi, writer
Mohamad Haghgou, composer
Sima Bina, Iranian folk music singer
Ahmad Kamyabi Mask, writer and renowned theater scholar
Mohammad Hassan Ganji, geographer
Mohammad Ismail Rezvani, historian
Mohammad Reza Hafeznia
Gholam Hossein Shokouei

Kazem Motamadnejad
Shah Seyyed Ali Kazemi, Last tribal leader in Moud and Birjand at the beginning of Pahlavi Dynasty
Mohammad Hossain Ayati
Mohammad Ibrahim Ayati
Seyyed Hassan Tahami
Ardalan Shoja Kaveh, actor

See also

Akbarieh Garden
Furg citadel
Khorashad
Mahmuei
Mud

References

External links

 All About Birjand

 

Birjand County

Populated places in South Khorasan Province

Populated places in Birjand County

Iranian provincial capitals

Cities in South Khorasan Province